, also written 2012 FC71, is a small asteroid trapped in a Kozai resonance with the Earth.

Discovery, orbit and physical properties 
It was first observed on 31 March 2012 by Andrea Boattini, observing for the Mt. Lemmon Survey. 
Its orbit is characterized by low eccentricity (0.088), low inclination (4.97º) and a semi-major axis of 0.9895 AU. It is an Aten asteroid but also an Earth crosser. As of 21 April 2012 its orbit is based on 35 observations spanning a data-arc of 21 days. This short observation arc results in an orbit uncertainty of 7. It has not been seen since and is unlikely to be seen again for several decades. It will remain both very dim (around apparent magnitude 27), and close in the sky to the Sun (solar elongation of less than 90 degrees), making it impossible to observe with current ground based telescopes till the 2060s. A number of times during the decade it will again be visible in the night sky and at times be brighter than apparent magnitude 21, as when it was first observed.

Kozai resonator and future orbital evolution 
 is locked in a Kozai resonance and as such it has a very slow orbital evolution and it will remain relatively unperturbed for hundreds of thousands of years. It had a close encounter with the Earth on 18 April 2012 at 0.076 AU when it was discovered and another on 17 May 2013 at 0.0581 AU, which was not observed.

Origin 
It may have been originated within the Venus-Earth-Mars region or in the main asteroid belt like other Near-Earth Objects, then transitioned to an Amor-class asteroid before entering Earth's co-orbital region.

See also 

 3753 Cruithne

Notes 

  This is assuming an albedo of 0.20–0.04.

References 
 

Further reading
 Secular perturbations of asteroids with high inclination and eccentricity Kozai, Y. 1962, Astronomical Journal, Vol. 67, p. 591
 The Kozai resonance for near-Earth asteroids with semimajor axes smaller than 2AU Michel, P., & Thomas, F. 1996, Astronomy and Astrophysics, Vol. 307, p. 310
 A resonant family of dynamically cold small bodies in the near-Earth asteroid belt de la Fuente Marcos, C., de la Fuente Marcos, R. 2013, Monthly Notices of the Royal Astronomical Society: Letters, Vol. 434, Issue 1, pp. L1-L5

External links 
 List Of Aten Minor Planets, Minor Planet Center
 MPEC 2012-G13 : 2012 FC71, discovery Minor Planet Electronic Circular (MPEC)
 AstDys-2 on 2012 FC71 at AstDys
 NEODyS-2 on 2012 FC71 at NEODyS
 
 
 

Minor planet object articles (unnumbered)
Discoveries by Andrea Boattini
Discoveries by MLS
Earth-crossing asteroids
20120331